State Route 656 (SR 656) is a state highway in the central portion of the U.S. state of Ohio.

Route description
SR 656 travels through northeastern Delaware County and southeastern Morrow County.  No part of the route is inclusive within the National Highway System.

History
This state highway was designated in 1937 along the alignment that it utilizes to this day between SR 61 and SR 229.  SR 656 has not experienced any major changes to its routing since its inception.

Major intersections

References

External links

656
Transportation in Delaware County, Ohio
Transportation in Morrow County, Ohio